Splicing factor U2AF 35 kDa subunit is a protein that in humans is encoded by the U2AF1 gene.

Function 

This gene belongs to the splicing factor SR family of genes . U2AF1 is a subunit of the U2 Auxiliary Factor complex alongside a larger subunit, U2AF2. U2AF1 is a non-snRNP protein required for the binding of U2 snRNP to the pre-mRNA branch site. This gene encodes a small (~35 kDa) subunit which plays a critical role in RNA splicing by recognizing and binding to AG nucleotides at the 3’ splice site to facilitate spliceosome assembly. Alternatively spliced transcript variants encoding different isoforms have been identified . Somatic mutations in U2AF1 have been found in a range of human cancers, with a distinctive pattern of these mutations at the zinc fingers implicating a functional role under selection. In lung cancers, these mutations affect alternative splicing of several transcripts, including oncogenic ROS1 fusions.
U2af1 conditional deletion in mouse hematopoietic system leads to early lethality suggesting its important for hematopoietic stem cell maintenance and function {https://doi.org/10.1038/s41375-020-01116-x }.

Interactions 

U2 small nuclear RNA auxiliary factor 1 has been shown to interact with:
 ASF/SF2, 
 NXF1, 
 RP9, 
 SMNDC1,
 U2AF2,  and
 ZRANB2.

References

Further reading

External links